LORAN-C transmitter Ejde was the Master station of the Ejde LORAN-C Chain ( GRI 9007). 
It used a transmission power of 400 kW.
Ejde LORAN-C transmitter used as antenna a 190.5 metre ( 625 ft) tall mast radiator.
In 1962 the mast of LORAN-C transmitter Ejde collapsed as a result of a slipping guy rope. The mast has been demolished.

External links
 http://www.tech-service.net/loran/LORAN-1.XLS
 http://www.megapulse.com/chaininfo.html

LORAN-C transmitters
Buildings and structures in Eiði Municipality